Patty Fendick (born March 31, 1965) is a former professional tennis player and the former women's tennis program head coach at University of Texas.

Born in Sacramento, California, she played at the collegiate level at Stanford University, where the team won the NCAA team title three times. In 1987, she was named ITA Player of the Year, when on the Stanford tennis team she had a 57-match winning streak. She won two NCAA singles titles in 1986 and 1987. She won the Broderick Award (now the Honda Sports Award) as the nation's top collegiate tennis player in 1987. Her playing accomplishments, as a collegiate and professional player, has elevated her being inducted into the Stanford Hall of Fame and also recognized as the Most Outstanding Student-Athlete of the first 25 years of NCAA women's tennis.

Fendick remains active in the sport of tennis as a coach and by serving on numerous committees with ITA and USTA. She was previously a tennis coach with the Washington Huskies.

Grand Slam finals

Doubles: 5 (1 title, 4 runner-ups)

WTA career finals

Doubles: 36 (20–16)

References

External links
 
 
 

1965 births
Living people
American female tennis players
American tennis coaches
Australian Open (tennis) champions
Sportspeople from Sacramento, California
Stanford Cardinal women's tennis players
Tennis people from California
Texas Longhorns women's tennis coaches
Wimbledon junior champions
Grand Slam (tennis) champions in women's doubles
Grand Slam (tennis) champions in girls' doubles
Washington Huskies women's tennis coaches